is a town located in Miyagi Prefecture, Japan. ,  the town had an estimated population of 22,804 and a population density of 50 persons per km2 in 8119 households.

Geography
Kami is located in west-central Miyagi Prefecture, bordered by Yamagata Prefecture to the west.  Parts of the town are within the borders of the Funagata Renpō Prefectural Natural Park.

Neighboring municipalities
Miyagi Prefecture
Ōsaki
Shikama
Yamagata Prefecture
Obanazawa
Mogami

Climate
The town has a climate characterized by cool summers and long cold winters (Köppen climate classification Cfa).  The average annual temperature in Kami is 11.4 °C. The average annual rainfall is 1336 mm with September as the wettest month. The temperatures are highest on average in August, at around 24.6 °C, and lowest in January, at around -0.8 °C.

Demographics
Per Japanese census data, the population of Kami has declined over the past 70 years.

History
The area of present-day Kami was part of ancient Mutsu Province, and has been settled since at least the Jōmon period by the Emishi people. Kami District is mentioned in early Nara period records. Per the Shoku Nihongi, following a huge earthquake in the year 715 AD, a large number of people migrated to this area from the southern Kantō region, forming numerous fortified settlements. During later portion of the Heian period, the area was ruled by the Northern Fujiwara. During the Sengoku period, the area was contested by various samurai clans before the area came under the control of the Date clan of Sendai Domain during the Edo period, under the Tokugawa shogunate. Following the Meiji restoration, the town of Nakaniida was established within Kami District, Miyagi with the creation of the modern municipalities system.

The town of Kami was created on April 1, 2003, as a result of a merger between three towns, Miyazaki, Nakaniida, and Onoda, all from Kami District.

Government
Kami has a mayor-council form of government with a directly elected mayor and a unicameral town council of 18 members. Kami, together with the rest of Kami District collectively contributes one seat to the Miyagi Prefectural legislature. In terms of national politics, the town is part of Miyagi 4th district of the lower house of the Diet of Japan.

Economy
The economy of Kami is largely based on agriculture, primarily the cultivation of rice.

Education
Kami has nine public elementary schools and three public junior high schools operated by the town government. The town has one public high school operated by the Miyagi Prefectural Board of Education.

Transportation

Railway
Kami does not have any passenger railway service.

Highway

Local attractions
Jō Palisade Site, ruins of Nara-period fortification; National Historic Site.
Higashiyama Kanga ruins, Nara period ruins, National Historic Site 
Urushizawa Dam

Noted people from Kami 
Mikio Igarashi, manga artist

References

External links

Official Website 

 
Towns in Miyagi Prefecture